Toyo straw is a type of shiny smooth straw made chiefly in Japan with shellacked rice paper. This material is commonly used for straw hats and fedoras.

Hats woven from this material are smooth and lightweight, and are often an off-white or golden copper color. The rice paper is coated with shellac, cellophane, or a plastic glaze. Machine-made toyo straw hats are generally sold in the medium to low price range.

References

Hatmaking
Textile arts